Oeonus is a genus of skippers in the family Hesperiidae.

Species
Recognised species in the genus Oeonus include:
 Oeonus pyste Godman, 1900

Former species
Oeonus brunnescens Hayward, 1939 - transferred to Naevolus brunnescens (Hayward, 1939)
Oeonus garima Schaus, 1902 - transferred to Gallio garima (Schaus, 1902)
Oeonus immaculatus Hayward, 1940 - transferred to Ralis immaculatus (Hayward, 1940)
Oeonus subviridis Hayward, 1940 - transferred to Viridina subviridis (Hayward, 1940)
Oeonus zenus Bell, 1942 - transferred to Alychna zenus (Bell, 1942)

References

Natural History Museum Lepidoptera genus database

Hesperiini
Hesperiidae genera